Haplotaxodon microlepis is a species of fish in the family Cichlidae. It is endemic to Lake Tanganyika in Burundi, the Democratic Republic of the Congo, Tanzania, and Zambia. The adults spend most of their time in the open waters of the lake, either solitarily or in pairs. They sometimes form schools near the shores where there are rocky shorelines. They feed on zooplankton.

References

Haplotaxodon
Taxa named by George Albert Boulenger
Fish described in 1906
Taxonomy articles created by Polbot